Brandonville is a census-designated place (CDP) in East Union Township, Schuylkill County, Pennsylvania, United States. The population was 217 at the 2000 census.

Geography
Brandonville is located at  (40.860825, -76.166718).

Demographics

At the 2000 census there were 217 people, 90 households, and 59 families living in the CDP. The population density was 153.4 people per square mile (59.4/km). There were 99 housing units at an average density of 70.0/sq mi (27.1/km).  The racial makeup of the CDP was 100.00% White.
Of the 90 households 23.3% had children under the age of 18 living with them, 43.3% were married couples living together, 11.1% had a female householder with no husband present, and 34.4% were non-families. 31.1% of households were one person and 14.4% were one person aged 65 or older. The average household size was 2.41 and the average family size was 2.98.

The age distribution was 19.4% under the age of 18, 6.5% from 18 to 24, 24.4% from 25 to 44, 27.6% from 45 to 64, and 22.1% 65 or older. The median age was 44 years. For every 100 females, there were 114.9 males. For every 100 females age 18 and over, there were 105.9 males.

The median household income was $26,125 and the median family income  was $36,875. Males had a median income of $25,833 versus $20,417 for females. The per capita income for the CDP was $14,973. About 3.8% of families and 7.7% of the population were below the poverty line, including 4.8% of those under the age of eighteen and none of those sixty five or over.

References

Census-designated places in Schuylkill County, Pennsylvania
Census-designated places in Pennsylvania